Fadnavis is a surname. Notable people with the surname include:

Devendra Fadnavis (born 1970), 18th Chief Minister of Maharashtra state in India
Nana Fadnavis (1742–1800), influential minister and statesman of the Maratha Empire during the Peshwa administration in Pune, India

See also may refer to:
Devendra Fadnavis ministry (2014–), list of the ministers of his ministry
Shobha Fadnavis,  member of Maharashtra Legislative Council and a former minister in Government of Maharashtra in India

Marathi-language surnames